The Norwegian Directorate for Nature Management (DN) was Norway's national governmental body for preserving Norway's natural environment, including establishing and regulating national parks and other protected areas until 2013 when it was merged into the Norwegian Environment Agency.

The directorate's stated mission was "to preserve biological diversity and strengthen the common right of access to the countryside".

The organization was based in Trondheim and employed about 250 employees. It concerned itself with designating areas for protection, monitoring and preserving biological diversity, as well as setting and enforcing fish and hunting quotas.

Directors included Helge Vikan (1985–1988), Peter Johan Schei (1989–1995), Stein Lier-Hansen (1995–2000) and Janne Sollie (2001–unknown).

External links
Directorate for Nature Management English website

 
Nature conservation in Norway
Organisations based in Trondheim
National park administrators
Ministry of Climate and Environment (Norway)
Defunct government agencies of Norway